A  is a type of very small garden in Japan. Other spellings of  translate to "container garden", and a  may differ in size from the  unit of measurement.

A number of different terms exist to describe the function of townhouse gardens. The  is found at the front of a traditional townhouse, with additional  often found in the interior and at the rear.

History

 were originally found in the interior courtyards of Heian period palaces, designed to give a glimpse of nature and some privacy to the residents of the rear side of the building.

During the Edo period, merchants began building small gardens in the space between their shops – which faced the street – and their residences, located behind the shop.

 gained greater popularity in the early 21st century, and can be found in many Japanese residences, hotels, restaurants, and public buildings. Multistory and underground interior spaces present difficulties for  cultivation; artificial lighting, anidolic lighting (using fiberoptic cables to pipe in sunlight), and a combination of both have been used.

Purpose

 are used to provide a touch of nature, connect the outdoors to the indoors, and make an indoor space seem larger; they can also act as light wells. Several  are used to provide passive ventilation in an otherwise small home, allowing a breeze to blow through the living space (see tablinum).

 are often set up where they can be seen by home occupants while relaxing or eating dinner. Commercial restaurants and eateries, such as ramen shops, may also have , placed so that guests can see them while eating.

 use less space than larger gardens and are cheaper to build. , the cost is in the low hundred thousand yen (low thousands of US dollars) for professional installation. Do-it-yourself kits cost a tenth as much and upwards. They also take less time to maintain; keeping a traditional Japanese garden is considered a meditative act.

Contents
 

They may also contain sculptures. Much of the area may be filled with gravel, set with larger stones, and carefully raked and kept free of weeds. Plants may be very minimal, and surrounded by stones, or the whole area may be covered with vegetation. Shade-loving plants are needed, as a narrow courtyard will seldom be in direct sunlight. Dwarf plants may also be used. A few stems of bamboo are common, but not ubiquitous. Artificial plants are also sometimes used.

Famous 

Totekiko is a famous courtyard garden using no vegetation at all.

See also
Tablinum, for the physics of ventilating and cooling using courts and gardens

References 

Japanese gardens
Japanese style of gardening
Japanese words and phrases